Choconta circulata is a species of froghopper in the genus Choconta, of the family of Cercopidae. The species has been named formerly Sphenorhina circulata (Lallemand), Tomaspis circulata (Fennah), and originally Cercopis circulatus. The species has been described first by French entomologist Félix Édouard Guérin-Méneville in 1844.

Etymology and habitat 
The genus Choconta is named after the town of Chocontá, Cundinamarca, on the Altiplano Cundiboyacense, Colombia, former territory of the Muisca. The froghopper has been found in Bogotá. Later discoveries of the species have been done in Venezuela.

Description 
The wings are granulated with a yellow irregular part in the middle. The upper part of the head and lower part above the thorax is red. The legs are black with red on top of the feet.

References

Bibliography 
 
 

Cercopidae
Insects of South America
Arthropods of Colombia
Invertebrates of Venezuela
Altiplano Cundiboyacense
Muysccubun
Insects described in 1844
Taxa named by Félix Édouard Guérin-Méneville